Giorgi Javakhia (born   September 24, 1996) is a Georgian rugby union player. His position is flanker, and he currently plays for Lyon in the Pro D2 and the Georgia national rugby union team.

References

1996 births
Living people
Georgia international rugby union players
Rugby union flankers
People from Tbilisi
Lyon OU players
Georgia national rugby union team
Stade Aurillacois Cantal Auvergne players